Hume's treecreeper (Certhia manipurensis) was earlier included within the brown-throated treecreeper complex and identified as a separate species on the basis of their distinctive calls. This species in the treecreeper family is found in Assam, Myanmar, Shan Mountains, Northern Thailand, Laos and the Dalat Plateau.

This form has a rich cinnamon throat and breast with support for their status coming from nd molecular evidence and calls.

The name commemorates the British naturalist Allan Octavian Hume who worked in India.

Notes

References
Harrap and Quinn, Tits, Nuthatches and Treecreepers 

Hume's treecreeper
Indomalayan realm fauna
Birds of Northeast India
Birds of Laos
Birds of Myanmar
Birds of Yunnan
Hume's treecreeper
Birds of Thailand